Roald Dahl's Matilda, also known as Matilda or Matilda the Musical, is a stage musical with music and lyrics by Tim Minchin and a book by Dennis Kelly, based on the 1988 novel Matilda by Roald Dahl. The musical's narrative centres on Matilda Wormwood, a precocious 5-year-old girl with the gift of telekinesis, who loves reading, overcomes obstacles caused by her family and school, and helps her teacher to reclaim her life. After a twelve-week trial run staged by the Royal Shakespeare Company (RSC) at Stratford-upon-Avon from November 2010 to January 2011, it received its West End premiere on 24 November 2011 at the Cambridge Theatre and its Broadway premiere on 11 April 2013 at the Shubert Theatre.

Matilda the Musical has received widespread critical acclaim and box-office popularity, winning seven 2012 Olivier Awards, including Best New Musicalat the time, the most such awards ever won by a single show. Cleo Demetriou, Kerry Ingram, Eleanor Worthington Cox and Sophia Kiely shared a Laurence Olivier Award for Best Actress in a Leading Role in a Musical. 10-year-old Eleanor Worthington became the youngest winner of the award in any category. At the 2013 Tony Awards, the show won five awards, including the Tony Award for Best Book of a Musical for Dennis Kelly.

A film adaptation was released on 25 November 2022 in the United Kingdom, followed by the United States on 9 December 2022.

Background 
In 1988, British children's author Roald Dahl wrote the original novel Matilda, illustrated by Quentin Blake, about a young intelligent girl who develops a love of reading despite her abusive parents and headmistress of her school incorporating rebellion and magical powers. The novel was adapted into a 1996 American film directed by Danny DeVito as well as an audio reading by Kate Winslet and a BBC Radio 4 programme narrated by Lenny Henry.

In December 2009, the Royal Shakespeare Company announced its intention to stage a musical adaptation with direction by Matthew Warchus and adaptation by Dennis Kelly. Musician and comedian Tim Minchin was chosen to write music and lyrics after Warchus saw his 2009 tour Ready for This? and persuaded during the encore song "White Wine in the Sun". It was also revealed comedian and musician Bill Bailey had been asked to write the songs, however turned the project down due to other works. Coincidentally Minchin revealed that he had originally attempted to gain permission from the Dahl estate to stage a musical adaptation in the early 2000s when writing for a local youth theatre in Perth, Western Australia.

Productions

Stratford-upon-Avon (2010–11)
In 2009, the Royal Shakespeare Company announced its intention to stage a musical adaptation of Matilda, engaging Dennis Kelly as playwright, Tim Minchin as the composer and lyricist, Matthew Warchus as director, Chris Nightingale as orchestrator and music supervision, Rob Howell as set designer and Paul Kieve as illusionist and special effects creator. The musical (originally titled Matilda, A Musical) opened at the Courtyard Theatre in Stratford-upon-Avon, England, on 9 December 2010 following previews from 9 November. The show was choreographed by Peter Darling. Bertie Carvel played Miss Trunchbull, with Paul Kaye and Josie Walker as Matilda's parents Mr and Mrs Wormwood, and Lauren Ward as Miss Honey. Three young actresses, Adrianna Bertola, Josie Griffiths and Kerry Ingram, alternated in the title role. The show ended its premiere engagement on 30 January 2011.

London (2011–present) 
In 2011, the musical received its West End debut (under the new title of Matilda the Musical) at London's Cambridge Theatre. The show was originally scheduled to begin previews on 18 October 2011, but because of structural and installation work at the theatre, the start of the performances was delayed until 25 October. The opening night was postponed from 22 to 24 November. The musical opened in London to uniformly positive reviews; Kaye and Carvel received high praise for their performances. Many of the principal adult cast from the Stratford run reprised their roles in London. Eleanor Worthington Cox, Cleo Demetriou, Sophia Kiely and Kerry Ingramthe only one to reprise her role from Stratford at this time  starred in the title role.

In October 2011, Matilda won Best Musical and Best Actor (Bertie Carvel) in the UK Theatre Awards, and in November 2011 it won the Ned Sherrin Award for Best Musical as part of The Evening Standard Theatre Awards. The production was nominated in all 10 categories for which it was eligible at the 2012 Olivier Awards. The four Matildas performed "Naughty" at the awards show. Matilda won 7 Oliviers: Best New Musical, Best Director (Warchus), Best Actor in a Musical (Carvel), Best Actress in a Musical (accepted by four Matildas), Best Theatre Choreographer (Darling), Best Set Design (Howell) and Best Sound Design (Baker). This was a record number for any show in the event's 36-year history.

On March 16, 2020, due to the COVID-19 pandemic, the show suspended performances, returning to the Cambridge Theatre from 16 September 2021. On 12 November 2021, a 10th anniversary performance celebrated 10 years since the show opened in the West End which featured a pre-show speech by Kelly and Minchin with many of the creatives and previous cast in attendance, including 42 previous Matildas.

Broadway (2013–17)
On 29 February 2012, the RSC announced the show would transfer to Broadway in spring 2013; it would still be set in England despite initial pressure for the show to be Americanised. On 19 July 2012, it was announced that the show would open on 11 April 2013 at the Shubert Theatre, with previews commencing on 4 March 2013.  Bertie Carvel and Lauren Ward reprised their roles as Miss Trunchbull and Miss Honey. Ted Wilson also continued as Eric. A four-girl cast consisting of Sophia Gennusa, Oona Laurence, Bailey Ryon, and Milly Shapiro played the titular role of Matilda.

The transfer cost  to produce; it opened as planned on 11 April 2013, with Sophia Gennusa playing the leading role. Small changes were made from the London production; some lyrics were changed to suit American audiences, and more scenes used the orchestra pit/front stalls area of the theatre. The Broadway production also introduced an overture and pre-show curtain, as of June 2013.

The Broadway production closed on 1 January 2017 after 1,555 performances.

US national tour (2015–17)
On 1 June 2013, Tim Minchin announced during an interview that the show was preparing for a US national tour. Minchin said, "We just got it up in New York, there's a touring version that is meant to be going on in America...". Once again produced by the Royal Shakespeare Company and The Dodgers, the tour began technical rehearsals and performances in May 2015 at the Shubert Theatre in New Haven, Connecticut, before its official launch on 7 June at the Ahmanson Theatre in Los Angeles, California. Announced stops included the SHN Orpheum Theare in San Francisco, California, the 5th Avenue Theatre in Seattle, Washington, the AT&T Performing Arts Center in Dallas, Texas, the Kennedy Center Opera House in Washington, D.C., and the Straz Center for the Performing Arts in Tampa, Florida. The cast was announced on 21 April 2015. Three girls would alternate in the lead role: Mia Sinclair Jenness, Gabby Gutierrez, and Mabel Tyler. Gutierrez and Tyler made their tour debuts; Jenness had appeared in the original Broadway cast and 25th anniversary tour of Les Misérables. Other principal cast members included Jennifer Blood as Miss Honey, Bryce Ryness as Miss Trunchbull, and Quinn Mattfeld and Cassie Silva as Mr. and Mrs. Wormwood.

The national tour of Matilda had its first official performance on 7 June 2015 at the Ahmanson Theatre in Los Angeles, California. Mia Sinclair Jenness played the title role. The US national tour took its final bow on 25 June 2017 at the Chapman Music Hall in Tulsa, Oklahoma.

Australian and New Zealand tour (2015–17)
Sydney:
In July 2013, Minchin said that an Australian production was planned for 2015. The production, produced by Louise Withers, had preview performances from 28 July before opening at the Sydney Lyric theatre on 20 August 2015. The ticketing release date (October 2014) was announced at Pier 2/3 in Walsh Bay, with Minchin, International Executive Producer André Ptaszynski, NSW Deputy Premier Andrew Stoner and Sydney press in attendance. The cast included Marika Aubrey and Daniel Frederiksen as Mr. and Mrs. Wormwood, Elise McCann as Miss Honey and James Millar as Miss Trunchbull. Sasha Rose (12), Georgia Taplin (11), Molly Barwick (10) and Bella Thomas (13) shared the title role with Thomas playing Matilda on the opening night. The Sydney season ended on Sunday 29 February with Georgia Taplin playing the title role, before transferring to Melbourne.

Melbourne:
For the Melbourne season, Dusty Bursill, Alannah Parfett, Tiana Mirra and Ingrid Torelli were announced to rotate playing the title role. On 3 January, Sydney Matilda Bella Thomas was injured and Parfett began her run early in Sydney, covering Thomas until she was better and joining the girls in a rotation until the end of the Sydney run. Mirra and Torelli made their debuts in Sydney's final week on 24 and 27 February respectively. The show opened at Melbourne's Princess Theatre on 13 March and was extended to perform until 11 November 2016. Some of the Sydney child cast members reprised their roles for selected performances in Melbourne; for example, certain performances featured Molly Barwick as Matilda.

Brisbane, Perth, Adelaide and Auckland:
A new season was announced to start in Brisbane, Perth, Adelaide, and Auckland. Izellah Connelly, Annabella Cowley, Venice Harris, Eva Murawski rotated the leading role of Matilda. The Matilda tour continued on to Brisbane from 25 November 2016 to 12 February 2017 at the Queensland Performing Arts Centre (QPAC) before moving on to perform at the Crown Theatre in Perth from 28 February until 7 May 2017 and from 21 May to 16 July 2017 at the Adelaide Festival Theatre in South Australia. The show ran in at the Civic Theatre in Auckland until 22 October 2017. Lucy Maunder was initially scheduled to take on the role of Miss Honey from McCann beginning the Brisbane leg. However, due to Maunder's pregnancy, the transition was postponed until 20 March 2017 midway through the Perth leg.

Toronto (2016–17) 
After the successful launches of Once and the Tony Award-winning Kinky Boots, Mirvish Productions chose to open a Canadian production of Matilda the Musical. The company opened at the Ed Mirvish Theatre beginning in July 2016, closing on 7 January 2017. Hannah Levinson, Jenna Weir, and Jaime MacLean rotated playing the title role. On 8 October 2016, Canadian Prime Minister Justin Trudeau and family attended a performance.

UK and Ireland tour (2018–19) 
On 11 April 2017, a tour was announced to begin at Curve, Leicester from 5–24 March 2018 before touring to Bord Gáis Energy Theatre, Dublin (4–28 April), Sunderland Empire (8 May - 2 June), Milton Keynes Theatre (5–30 June), Birmingham Hippodrome (3 July – 8 September), Manchester Palace Theatre (18 September – 24 November) and Wales Millennium Centre, Cardiff (4 December - 12 January 2019). Further venues were announced on 13 March 2018. The tour will go to Theatre Royal, Plymouth (15 January - 16 February 2019), the Alhambra Theatre, Bradford (19 February – 23 March), Edinburgh Playhouse (2–27 April), the Bristol Hippodrome (7 May - 8 June), Southampton Mayflower (11 June – 6 July) and Norwich Theatre Royal (16 July – 17 August).

On 17 October 2017, the adult cast was announced, to include Craige Els as Miss Trunchbull, Carly Thoms as Miss Honey, Sebastien Torkia as Mr Wormwood and Rebecca Thornhill as Mrs Wormwood. On 16 January 2018, the children's cast was announced, with the role of Matilda being shared between Annalise Bradbury, Lara Cohen, Poppy Jones and Nicola Turner. The tour officially opened as scheduled on 5 March 2018 at the Curve theatre in Leicester, with Poppy Jones in the title role on opening night.

Philippines (2017) 
Matilda had its Asian premiere in the Philippines on 10 November 2017. The production closed on 10 December 2017. This production was the first licensed production; it was not produced by the Royal Shakespeare Company, and has no links to the original production except for the score and script. The show featured Esang de Torres, Uma Martin, and Felicity Kyle Napuli alternating the title role, with Esang playing the role on opening night. The Manila production also had a 16-child strong cast alternating 8 other student roles, namely Gabrielle Aerin Ong and Maria Ericka Peralejo as Lavander; Denise Fidel Arteta and Chi Chi Tan as Amanda; Nicole Chien and Ella Gonzalez as Alice; Alba Berenguer-Testa and Chantel Marie Guinid as Hortensia; Josh Nubla and Miguel Suarez as Bruce; Rhythm Alexander and Ian Albert Magallona as Eric; Gabo Tiongson and Pablo Miguel Palacpac as Nigel; and John Joseph Miraflores and Teddy Velasco as Tommy.

Korea (2018–19, 2022–23) 
In July 2017, Seensee Company announced they would be producing a production of Matilda the Musical in September 2018. The production will be in arrangement with the RSC and be the first non-English version of Matilda produced. The company includes a cast consisting of four girls, named Li Ji Na, An So Myeong, Hwang Ye Yeong, and Seol Ga Eun that will rotate in the title role of Matilda, as well as a 16-member child cast that will play the roles of Matilda's classmates. The production opened their preview show on 8 September 2018, with An So Myeong in the title role. Li Ji Na and Seol Ga Eun played their first performances on 9 September, and Hwang Ye Yeong had first debut as Matilda on 14 September. A 12 September press call included a performance of Naughty by Hwang Ye Young, Quiet by Seol Ga Eun, a performance of Revolting Children, and more. The production officially closed on 10 February 2019, with Hwang Ye Yeong playing the title role. 

In April 2020, Seensee Company announced they will be running another production of Matilda the Musical from October 2022 to January 2023, in Daesung D Cube Art Center. The cast includes four girls playing Matilda (Lim Ha Yun, Jin Yeon Woo, Choi Eun Yeong, Ha Sin Bi), a 16-member child cast, and a 26-member adult cast. The production opened their preview show on 5 October 2022.

International tour (2018–20) 
South Africa:
An international tour began at the Teatro At Montecasino in Johannesburg from 17 October to 2 December 2018, before running at the Artscape Opera House in Cape Town from 11 December 2018 to 13 January 2019. The tour cast was announced on 28 August 2018 Lilla Fleischmann, Kitty Harris, and Morgan Santo in the role of Matilda. Other cast members include Ryan de Villers as Miss Trunchbull, Bethany Dickson as Miss Honey, Stephen Jubber and Claire Taylor as Mr. and Mrs. Wormwood, and Nonpumelelo Mayiyane as Mrs. Phelps. Matilda's classmates will be played by Jack Fokkens, Keeran Isaacs, Robyn Ivey, Joshua LeClair, Levi Maron, Ipeleng Merafe, Megan Saayman, Taylor Salgado, Cameron Seear and Zac Gabriel Werb. The rest of the adult ensemble includes Jasmin Colangelo, Katrina Dix, Sinead Donnelly, Michael Gardiner, Kent Jeycocke, Weslee Lauder, Carlo McFarlane, Kenneth Meyer, Daniel Parrott, Adrianna Patlaszynska, Jonathan Raath, and Logan Timbr.

Singapore:
Following the South African runs, the international tour began a run at the Sands Theater at Marina Bay Sands. At this time, Sofia Poston joined the show as Matilda. She will rotate along with Fleischmann, Harris, and Santo. Poston had her debut on the tour's opening night in Singapore. The tour will perform there from 21 February to 17 March 2019.

China:
Following the Singaporean runs, the international tour ran across 13 cities in China from June 2019 to January 2020.

Philippines:
The Manila leg of the international tour at The Theater at Solaire at Solaire Resort & Casino, ran from 5 March and ended early on 13 March 2020 due to the fears of coronavirus in the country, it was supposed to end on 25 March 2020. Zara Yazbek Polito, Sofia Poston, and Zoe Modlinne will rotate in the title role. Haley Flaherty and Hayden Tee will reprise their West End roles as Miss Honey and Miss Trunchbull. The cast also includes Stephen Jubber as Mr. Wormwood, Matthew Leck as Bruce Bogtrotter, Claire Taylor as Mrs. Wormwood, and Nompumelelo Mayiyane as Mrs. Phelps.

Japan (2023) 
In June 2022, HoriPro announced that a Japanese version of Matilda would be performed at Tokyu Theatre Orb in Tokyo, Japan starting from Spring 2023. The cast includes Sakura Kamura, Minori Kumano, Miran Terada and Nonoka Mikami sharing the role of Matilda as well as Yusuke Onuki, Ryunosuke Onoda and  alternating as Miss Agatha Trunchbull, Miyu Sakihi and Natsumi Kon alternating as Miss Jennifer Honey, Mario Tashiro and Tsukasa Saito (from Trendy Angel) alternating as Mr. Wormwood, Hiromu Kiriya and Chihiro Otsuka alternating as Mrs. Wormwood and Mayumi Oka and Yukiko Ikeda alternating as Mrs. Phelps.

US Regional Productions 
In 2018, a small number of major regional theaters produced Matilda. Walnut Street Theatre's production of Matilda was the first regional production after the show closed down on Broadway. Philadelphia's Walnut Street Theatre produced Matilda with performances beginning on 6 November 2018 for a total run of 4 months through 2019. Matilda was played by Jemma Bleu Greenbaum and Ellie Biron.

Synopsis

Act I
As a chorus of children boast about being their parents' miracles, the ballroom dancing-obsessed Mrs. Wormwood gives birth to a baby girl called Matilda. The doctor thinks Matilda is the most beautiful child he has ever seen, but Mrs. Wormwood is only worried about a dancing contest she has missed. Similarly shallow, Mr. Wormwood—a used-car salesman and television addict—dismisses the child when he realizes she is a girl ("Miracle"). Five years later, Matilda is an avid reader and lives unhappily with her parents. The Wormwoods are oblivious to her genius and frequently mock and verbally abuse her. Matilda adds some of her mother's hydrogen peroxide to her father's hair oil, leaving Mr. Wormwood with bright green hair ("Naughty").

At the local library Matilda tells Mrs. Phelps a story about a world-famous acrobat and escapologist couple who long to have a child but they can't. To distract themselves from their sadness they announce to the world's press that they will perform an exciting and dangerous new act ("Once Upon a Time"). The next day is Matilda's first day at school ("School Song"). Her teacher Miss Honey is impressed by Matilda's precociousness and ability, so she recommends that Matilda be moved to the top class with the older children ("Pathetic"). However, the child-hating, disciplinarian headmistress Miss Trunchbull, a former world champion hammer thrower, dismisses Miss Honey's suggestion and lectures her on the importance of following rules ("The Hammer").

At the Wormwoods' house, Mr. Wormwood is frustrated about losing a sale of worn-out cars to a group of rich Russians. He takes his frustration out on Matilda and destroys one of her library books, prompting her to put superglue around the rim of his hat and fix it to his head ("Naughty" reprise). At school, Matilda is told of Miss Trunchbull's cruel punishments, including the Chokey: a tiny cupboard lined with sharp objects in which she locks disobedient children for hours ("The Chokey Chant"). Matilda sees Miss Trunchbull spin a small girl, Amanda Thripp, around by her pigtails and throw her across the playing field. Meanwhile, Miss Honey decides to visit the Wormwoods to express her recommendation that Matilda be put in an advanced class. She meets Mrs. Wormwood and her dance partner Rudolpho. It soon becomes apparent that Mrs. Wormwood doesn't care about her daughter's intelligence, and she mocks Miss Honey and Matilda's interest in books and intellect ("Loud"). Alone outside the Wormwood's house, Miss Honey is desperate to help Matilda but feels powerless to do so ("This Little Girl").

Matilda tells Mrs. Phelps more about the acrobat and the escapologist. The acrobat's sister, a former world champion hammer-thrower who loves to scare small children, has arranged their performance. The escapologist announces that the performance has been cancelled because the acrobat is pregnant. The crowd is thrilled but the acrobat's sister is furious at the prospect of refunding the crowd's money and produces a contract binding them to perform the act or go to jail ("The Great Day Arrived"). At school, Bruce Bogtrotter, a boy in Matilda's class, has stolen a slice of Miss Trunchbull's personal chocolate cake. Miss Trunchbull punishes Bruce by forcing him to eat the entire cake in front of the class, who bravely support him ("Bruce"). After Bruce has finished the cake, the class celebrates his success but Miss Trunchbull drags Bruce away to the Chokey.

Act II
Mr. Wormwood advises the audience against reading in favor of watching television ("Telly"). Lavender, a girl in Matilda's class, tells the audience that she is going to put a newt in Miss Trunchbull's jug of water later on. The children gather and sing about their hopes for when they grow up ("When I Grow Up"). Matilda resolves to end Miss Trunchbull's cruelty. She tells Mrs. Phelps more of the story of the acrobat and the escapologist. Bound by their contract, they perform their feat, which goes well until the last moment when the acrobat is fatally injured, living just long enough to give birth to a girl. The escapologist invites the acrobat's sister to move in with him to help look after his daughter. Unknown to the escapologist, the girl's aunt is secretly cruel to her, forcing her to perform menial tasks and abusing her verbally and physically ("The Trick Started Well").

Mr. Wormwood returns home from work pleased because he has sold his worn-out cars to the wealthy Russians ("I'm So Clever"), having used an automatic drill to wind back their odometers. Matilda is annoyed at her father's deceit and scolds him, which angers him and he locks her in her bedroom. That night, Matilda continues the story of the acrobat and the escapologist. After years of cruelty, the aunt's rage has grown; one day she beats the child, locks her in the cellar and goes out. That evening, the escapologist returns home early and discovers the extent of the aunt's cruelty. As he comforts his daughter, he promises her he will always be there for her. Filled with rage, he runs out to find the aunt but is never seen again ("I'm Here").

The next day, Miss Trunchbull forces Miss Honey's class to undergo a gruelling physical education lesson ("The Smell of Rebellion"). Miss Trunchbull discovers the newt in her jug; she accuses one of the boys, Eric, who has already riled her during the lesson. She starts to punish him. Matilda scolds Miss Trunchbull for being a bully. Miss Trunchbull verbally abuses Matilda, but Matilda discovers she can move objects with her mind ("Quiet"). She tips over the water jug and the newt lands on Miss Trunchbull, and climbs up her leg. After Miss Trunchbull leaves Matilda demonstrates her powers to Miss Honey, who is surprised and invites Matilda to her house for tea. On the way Matilda admits that her father is not proud of her and calls her names.

Miss Honey tells Matilda of her cruel and abusive aunt, who looked after her as a child after her parents died. When Miss Honey first became a teacher, her aunt produced a bill detailing everything Miss Honey consumed as a child, along with other expenses, and forced her to sign a contract binding her to pay it all back. Desperate to escape, Miss Honey found refuge in an old farm shed which she moved into and lives in abject poverty. Despite this, Miss Honey finds beauty in her meagre living conditions ("My House"). As Miss Honey tells her story, she produces a scarf which Matilda recognizes from her story of the acrobat and the escapologist—which she realizes is the true story of Miss Honey's childhood, and that her wicked aunt is Miss Trunchbull.

Back at school, Miss Trunchbull forces the children to take a spelling test; anyone who misspells a word will be sent to the Chokey. The children fail to misspell a single word, so Miss Trunchbull invents a word in order to be able to punish Lavender. As Lavender is about to be taken to the Chokey, her classmates deliberately misspell simple words, telling her she cannot send them all to the Chokey. However, Miss Trunchbull has built many more Chokeys. Matilda uses her powers to write on the blackboard and convinces Miss Trunchbull that it is the ghost of Miss Honey's father, demanding that she give his daughter back her house or he will get her ("Chalk Writing"). Miss Trunchbull runs from the school screaming and the children celebrate their freedom ("Revolting Children").

At the library, Miss Honey and Mrs. Phelps relay the aftermath of the events. A few days after Miss Trunchbull ran away, Miss Honey's parents' will has been found; they left all their money and their house to her. Miss Trunchbull is never seen again and Miss Honey becomes the new headmistress of the school. Matilda cannot use her powers again and Miss Honey is sad that a child who has helped others this way is stuck in an unloving home. The Wormwoods arrive at the library in a panic, telling Matilda that she must leave with them because they are fleeing to Spain. Mrs. Wormwood states that the wealthy Russians that her husband was dealing with are the Russian mafia, who are unhappy about being sold broken cars. Miss Honey asks if Matilda can stay with her, but the Russian mafia arrive before a decision can be made. As the Wormwoods hide, Sergei is impressed and moved by Matilda's intellect and respect and he agrees not to harm the Wormwoods providing he never has to deal with Mr. Wormwood again ("This Little Girl" reprise). Mr. Wormwood agrees to let Matilda live with Miss Honey as the Wormwoods leave for Spain ("When I Grow Up" reprise / "Naughty" reprise II).

Musical numbers

 Act I
 "Overture" – Orchestra §
 "Miracle" – Children, Party Entertainer, Doctor, Mrs. Wormwood, Mr. Wormwood, Matilda, Ensemble
 "Naughty" – Matilda
 "Story 1: Once Upon a Time" – Matilda, Mrs. Phelps, Acrobat, Escapologist §
 "School Song" – Ensemble
 "Pathetic" – Miss Honey
 "The Hammer" – Miss Trunchbull, Miss Honey, Children, Ensemble
 "Naughty" (Reprise) – Matilda §‡
 "The Chokey Chant" – Ensemble §
 "Loud" – Mrs. Wormwood, Rudolpho, Ensemble
 "This Little Girl" – Miss Honey
 "Story 2: The Great Day Arrived" – Matilda, Mrs. Phelps, Acrobat, Escapologist, Acrobat's Sister §
 "Bruce" – Company

 Act II
 "Telly" – Mr. Wormwood, Michael
 "Entr'acte" – Orchestra ‡
 "When I Grow Up" – Children, Miss Honey, Matilda, Company
 "Story 3: The Trick Started Well..." – Matilda, Mrs. Phelps, Acrobat, Escapologist §
 "I'm So Clever" – Mr. Wormwood §‡
 "Story 4: I'm Here" – Matilda, Escapologist
 "The Smell of Rebellion" – Miss Trunchbull, Children
 "Quiet" – Matilda
 "My House" – Miss Honey, Escapologist
 "Chalk Writing" – Miss Trunchbull, Children §
 "Revolting Children" – Children, Ensemble
 "This Little Girl" (Reprise) – Sergei §‡
 Finale: "When I Grow Up" (Reprise)/"Naughty" (Reprise) - Company

§ Not present on the original London cast recording
‡ Not present on the original Broadway cast recording

The instrumentation uses a ten-to-thirteen-piece orchestra, including keyboards, reeds, brass, strings and percussion. The performances run 2 hours and 40 minutes, including one interval. The "Overture" is included in the Broadway production only while the "Entr'acte" was only used in the London production where it has now been cut apart from the final bars which lead into "When I Grow Up".

Recordings
The cast album recorded by the original Stratford company was released on CD in September 2011 and a month later as a Digital Download. It features a hidden spoken track which follows "When I Grow Up" (Reprise). This is the full version speech that is heard in part, before, during and after "Quiet" in the show.

A new Original Broadway cast album was released on 22 September 2013 as a CD. This contains more tracks than the UK recording and includes "The Chokey Chant". The deluxe version features Matilda's stories of the Acrobat and the Escapologist, the song "Perhaps a Child" sung by Sergei, which was cut from the show early on in the Stratford previews due to time constraints, but the final lines were included in the Broadway show as "This Little Girl Reprise". The album also included "Naughty" with all four Broadway Matildas singing.

Principal roles and original cast members

Notable West End replacements
 Matilda – Isobelle Molloy, Chloe Hawthorn, Lara Wollington
 Miss Trunchbull – Alex Gaumond
Miss Honey – Gina Beck
Mr. Wormwood – Steve Furst
Mrs. Phelps - Sharlene Whyte, Lisa Davina Phillip

Notable Broadway replacements
 Matilda - Gabriella Pizzolo, Brooklyn Shuck
 Miss Trunchbull – Craig Bierko, Christopher Sieber
 Miss Honey – Jill Paice
 Mr. Wormwood – Matt Harrington
 Mrs. Wormwood – Amy Spanger
 Mrs. Phelps – Natalie Venetia Belcon

Film adaptation

In June 2013, Minchin said a future film adaptation was being planned. He said during an interview, "We just got [the show] up in New York, there's a touring version that is meant to be going on in America, concurrently the English version is up, there's a film that will probably be made in the next 4 or 5 years and all this sort of stuff." Mara Wilson, who played Matilda in the original 1996 film adaptation of Dahl's novel, said, "Maybe if they made it into a movie, I could have a cameo, but that’s for them to decide." Kelly, who wrote the book of the musical, is set to write the film's screenplay, with Minchin writing additional songs and music, and Warchus directing the film.

In April 2020, Ralph Fiennes was rumoured as cast in the role of Miss Trunchbull. The film was originally expected to shoot from August to December 2020 at Shepperton Studios, however, the shooting schedule for the film was interrupted due to lockdown procedures in place for the COVID-19 pandemic.

In January 2021, Lashana Lynch, Emma Thompson and Alisha Weir were confirmed as cast in the roles of Miss Honey, Miss Trunchbull and the titular role respectively, with over 200 children cast as the rest of the student body of Crunchem Hall. Ellen Kane, who worked with choreographer Peter Darling on the stage production, is set to choreograph. The film was expected to begin principal photography on May 3, 2021 in Ireland. The film is intended to be produced by Tim Bevan and Eric Fellner through Working Title Films and distributed by Netflix worldwide and Sony Pictures Releasing through its TriStar Pictures banner in the United Kingdom.

In April 2021, it was announced that Stephen Graham, Andrea Riseborough and Sindhu Vee would be joining the cast as Mr. Wormwood, Mrs. Wormwood and Mrs. Phelps respectively. Meesha Garbett as Hortensia, Charlie Hodson-Prior as Bruce, Andrei Shen as Eric, Ashton Robertson as Nigel, Winter Jarrett Glasspool as Amanda and Rei Yamachi Fulker as Lavender make up some of the 200 dancing, singing and acting kids.

The film was theatrically released in the United Kingdom on 25 November 2022, while in other countries was available on Netflix on 25 December.

Critical reception

2010 RSC Stratford production
Michael Billington, writing for The Guardian, gave the musical four stars out of five. He praised the adaptation of the book, the "ebullient music and lyrics", the direction, the stage design and the performancesespecially Bertie Carvel as Miss Trunchbull. The Independent also gave the show four out of five stars and said, "The Royal Shakespeare Company has struck gold with this wildly entertaining musical … Kelly's clever adaptation and the witty, intricate songs by ... Minchin create a new, improved version of Dahl's story ... Warchus's wondrously well-drilled production finds just the right balance between gleeful grotesque humour and heart-warming poignancy."

Charles Spencer, writing for The Daily Telegraph awarded the show all five stars and praised the "splendidly witty, instantly hummable songs, dazzling choreography, a cast of impossibly cute and delightful children and a fantastic star turn from Bertie Carvel ... [Kelly's] script has both deepened the emotion of Dahl's story while adding loads of splendid jokes of his own", and concluded, "It is funny, heart-warming, and bang-on target". Matt Wolf of The Arts Desk said: "I was struck by the sight of many a child grinning as openly as their adult companions were wiping away tears". Henry Hitchings of the London Evening Standard also praised the performances, direction and design and commented on Minchin's "witty songs [in which] he switches between styles with remarkable dexterity". He continued, "There's a playfulness throughout [the book] that proves intoxicating ... In this lovingly created show, Matilda'''s magic positively sparkles. There's a cleverness in the writing which ensures that, while it appeals to children, there is plenty for adults to savour ... it's blissfully funny."

In September 2019, The Guardian writers listed the RSC performance of Matilda as the seventh best theatre show since 2000.

Original London production
The reviews of the London performances were also extremely positive. Julie Carpenter of the Daily Express awarded the show all five stars and called the musical "[g]loriously over the top", and said, "it's an irresistible and ingenious mix of fun, fizz, cruelty, incredible choreography and above all warmth which means we root for the kids from the start. Fantastic." Henry Hitchings' review in the Evening Standard ranked the piece five stars, praising the music and lyrics, book, set design, choreography, direction and performances. The review in The Guardian said, "You'd be a nitwit to miss this hit show." The Stage also gave Matilda five stars, as did Spencer, writing again for The Telegraph. Confirming his impression of the 2010 production, he wrote about the West End transfer:

The Financial Times, The Times and The Sunday Times each awarded the show four stars out of five, but found little to criticise.
Ben Brantley, writing for The New York Times, called the adaptation "a sweet and sharp-witted work of translation, which ... turns dark and sodden anxieties into bright and buoyant fantasies [that address] a raging thirst these days for [such] tonics". A year after the show opened, Time Out gave the production four stars out of five, noting the departure of Carvel and calling the show "a little too long and, dramatically, a tad wayward", but nevertheless "wise, wicked, glorious fun."

Original Broadway production
Most of the New York critics gave the Broadway transfer their highest marks. Brantley wrote: "Matilda works with astonishing slyness and grace to inculcate us with its radical point of view. [It] is about words and language, books and stories, and their incalculable worth as weapons of defense, attack and survival ... Above all it’s an exhilarating tale of empowerment". He also said the child actors "strengthen their diction" so that the "tasty lyrics" could be clearly heard. Richard Zoglin, in Time magazine said that the show is "a fresh start for the Broadway musical" with "a score that seems all but woven into the scenerysimple but distinctive tunes ... intricate lyrics ... Every element of the show seems hand-crafted and right". He said that director Warchus "lets the characters go gloriously over the top (the way children see them), but also brings a hushed intensity". He also said that the second act "runs a bit too long" and that "the combination of shrill child voices, British accents and heavy miking causes many of the lyrics to get muddled". Elisabeth Vincentelli's review in the New York Post said, "Once in a blue moon, a show comes out blazing and restores your faith in Broadway. Matilda The Musical is that show." David Rooney of The Hollywood Reporter said the stage show captured "the unique flavor of Roald Dahl’s classic 1988 children’s novel", and added, "this funhouse fairy tale is by turns riotous and poignant, grotesque and menacing, its campy comic exaggeration equaled only by its transporting emotional power".

David Cote, in Time Out New York, wondered whether the show was too English for Broadway tastes; he wrote, "Matilda is a kids' musical, not a musical that happens to be about a kid. As such, its attractions may be limited to younger spectators and die-hard Dahl fans. That would be a pity, since Matilda is wickedly smart and wildly fun". A review in USA Today said the show tries too hard to be clever, but it is affecting and enchanting. Of the British papers reviewing the transfer, The Telegraph gave the show four stars out of five, and said, "There's a harder-edged quality to the New York staging: the general tenor is louder and more exaggerated, and the Gilbertian finesse of [the] astonishing lyrics didn't translate for my companion ... But the tremendous heart and intelligence of the piece remains undimmed." A review by Brendan Lemon in the Financial Times also gave the piece four stars out of five.

Awards and nominations

London production

Broadway production

 Australian production 

References

Further reading
 "A Novel Approach," by Keith Loria, "Backstage" column, Make-Up Artist'' magazine, Number 102, June/July 2013, pp 74–75, Key Publishing Group, Vancouver, Washington, US. A two-page article with three color photos discussing the musical's make-up and hair/wig requirements for the New York and London productions, with quotes by key personnel.

External links
 Official website
 

2010 musicals
Broadway musicals
Musical
Critics' Circle Theatre Award-winning musicals
Laurence Olivier Award-winning musicals
Musicals based on works by Roald Dahl
West End musicals
Plays set in England
British musicals
Musicals based on novels
Tony Award-winning musicals